Xiangyang Subdistrict is a subdistrict in Fangshan District, Beijing, China. As of 2020, it had 19,142 residents under its administration.

History

Administrative Divisions 
As of 2021, Xiangyang Subdistrict was divided into 5 residential communities, which are listed as follows:

See also 
 List of township-level divisions of Beijing

References 

Fangshan District
Subdistricts of Beijing